Sunlong Bus (officially Shanghai Shenlong Bus Co., Ltd.), is a Chinese bus manufacturer based in Shanghai. it was established on 13 April 2001 and started export production on 2 February 2004.

Models

Sunlong produced logistics vans, 6-7m minibuses, 8-9m city buses, 8-9m tourist buses, 10-12m city buses and 10-12m tourist buses.

Vans

SLK5030 van, based on the fourth generation Jinbei Haise.
SLK5031 van, based on the DFSK K-Series
SLK5032 van, Based on the Chery Q22
Sunlong Guangxi Yibian NEV electric logistics van based on the Dongfeng captain EV400

Buses

SLK5180XLJ Motor home
SLK5228XLJ Motor home
SLK6016 Tourist bus
SLK6103 City bus
SLK6105 City bus
SLK6106 Tourist bus
SLK6111 City bus
SLK6113 City bus
SLK6115 City bus
SLK6116 Tourist bus
SLK6120 Tourist bus
SLK6122 City bus
SLK6125 City bus
SLK6126 Tourist bus
SLK6129 City bus
SLK6800XC School bus
SLK6602 minibus
SLK6702 minibus
SLK6750 minibus

SLK6750XC School bus
SLK6753 City bus
SLK6770 minibus
SLK6800 City bus
SLK6800 School bus
SLK6802 Tourist bus
SLK6840 Tourist bus
SLK6872 School bus
SLK6872 Tourist bus
SLK6850 Tourist bus
SLK6851 City bus
SLK6855 City bus
SLK6891 City bus
SLK6900 Tourist bus
SLK6902 Tourist bus
SLK6905 City bus
SLK6935 City bus
SLK6970 City bus
SLK6972 Tourist bus
SLK6985 Tourist bus
SLK6985 City Bus

References

External links
Sunlong Bus website

Bus manufacturers of China
Chinese brands
Manufacturing companies based in Shanghai
Vehicle manufacturing companies established in 2004
Chinese companies established in 2004